María Alexandra Ocles Padilla (born 22 January 1979 in Quito) is an Ecuadorian politician and educator.

Biography
Alexandra Ocles was born in Quito on 22 January 1979. From 1989 to 1990, she studied at the Manuela Cañizares College and then obtained a degree in educational sciences at Politecnica Salesiana University and the Latin American Social Sciences Institute.

Ocles was elected to the National Congress of Ecuador for the Socialist Party in 2003, then to the Constituent Assembly in 2007 for the  movement. She was made head of the People's Secretariat by Rafael Correa and held this position until January 2011. At that time, Ruptura 25 announced its departure from the government, stating that the President had exceeded the expectations of his office. In opposition to the 2011 referendum, Ocles and other members of Ruptura 25 resigned from their positions.

In May 2017, Ocles was named National Secretary of Risk Management by President Lenín Moreno to work with his team during his four year term,

Citations

Living people
1979 births
Women members of the National Assembly (Ecuador)
21st-century Ecuadorian women politicians
21st-century Ecuadorian politicians
PAIS Alliance politicians
Members of the National Congress (Ecuador)
People from Quito